Stanford Reservoir is a drinking water reservoir on the River Avon, England.  It lies on the county boundary between Leicestershire and Northamptonshire near the village of Stanford-on-Avon.

The reservoir was built between 1928 and 1930 by Rugby Urban District Council in order to supply the nearby town of Rugby with drinking water. It was created by building an earth and clay dam across the line of the original river, and flooding a small valley between the villages of South Kilworth and Stanford. At its north-eastern extremity, the river enters the reservoir via a settling pond and leaves at the other end via a spillway and a specially constructed channel below the dam. There is a by-pass channel along the northern perimeter, controlled by sluice gates, which allows the water level in the reservoir to be regulated and reduced for repair and maintenance works, and for the flow of water in the river below the dam to be maintained.

Following a 1 in 100 year flood risk assessment, the spillway was substantially reconstructed in 2017. 

It is now owned by the company Severn Trent Water.

The site is considered important for bird species including tufted duck, wigeon, pochard and shoveller and five species of bats. The Wildlife Trust for Bedfordshire, Cambridgeshire and Northamptonshire have a management agreement to look after wildlife aspects.

The reservoir is open to public visits, but requires a permit.

References

External links

Northamptonshire Nature Reserves 

Drinking water reservoirs in England
Reservoirs in Leicestershire
Reservoirs in Northamptonshire
RStanford